The Arizona State House of Representatives is the lower house of the Arizona Legislature, the state legislature of the U.S. state of Arizona. The upper house is the Senate. The House convenes in the legislative chambers at the Arizona State Capitol in Phoenix. Its members are elected to two-year terms, with a term limit of four consecutive terms (eight years). Each of the state's 30 legislative districts elects two state house representatives and one state senator, with each district having a population of at least 203,000.

The last election occurred on November 8, 2022, with the Republican Party currently holding a narrow majority in the House.

Leadership of the House
The Speaker is elected by the majority party caucus along with the Majority Leader, the Assistant Majority Leader, and the Majority Whip. The House as a whole shall pass a House resolution confirming the Speaker and the Chief Clerk of the House. In addition to presiding over the body, the Speaker is also the chief leadership position, and controls the flow of legislation and committee assignments. Outside of legislative authority, the Speaker is given the power to employ, terminate and alter the compensation of all House employees. The Speaker has full final authority of all expenses charged to the House of Representatives, further, the Speaker the individual responsible for approving House expense accounts. The minority party selects a Minority Leader, an Assistant Minority Leader and a Minority Whip in a closed caucus.

Leadership information

Current composition

Current members, 2023–2025

†Member was originally appointed to the office.

Past composition of the House of Representatives

Committees
The current standing committees of the Arizona House of Representatives are as follows:

See also

 List of representatives and senators of Arizona Legislature by districts (2023–2033)
 Arizona Legislature
 Arizona Senate
 Arizona State Capitol
 List of state and territorial capitols in the United States

Footnotes and references

Footnotes

References

External links

 Official Arizona House of Representatives website
 
 Arizona State Legislature website

House of Representatives
 
State lower houses in the United States